RTB may refer to:

Businesses and organisations 
Reasons to Believe, a creationist group
Richard Thomas and Baldwins, a former British steelmaker

Broadcasters 
RTBF, Belgium
Radio Television of Belgrade, Yugoslavia
Radio Television Brunei
Radio Télévision du Burkina, Burkina Faso

Military 
Return To Base, shorthand military command
Ranger Training Brigade, of the U.S. Army Ranger School

Other uses
Juan Manuel Gálvez International Airport (IATA airport code), Roatán, Honduras
Real-time bidding, in online advertising
Rothwell Temperance Band, UK, established 1881
Return-to-battery failure, a type of firearm malfunction
"Row the Boat," a slogan associated with college football coach P.J. Fleck